Laura Erber (born 1979) is a Brazilian writer and visual artist. She has exhibited throughout Brazil and Europe. Erber writes poetry that is internationally recognized, along with short stories, essays, and books. She works in multiple languages. She is interested in myths and the history of Brazil.

Biography 
Erber graduated from the State University of Rio de Janeiro in 2002 with a degree in Portuguese and Brazilian literature. She got a master's degree from Pontifical Catholic University of Rio de Janeiro in 2008, followed by a Ph.D in literature in 2012. She was a Ph.D. student at the University of Copenhagen in 2010. Erber was a visiting researcher at the Danish Film Institute in Copenhagen. She founded the digital publishing non-profit Zazie Editions in 2015, along with Karl Erik Schøllhammer, focused on essays on art and criticism.

Awards 
 Nova Fronteira prize (2001), for best free adaptation of João Guimarães Rosa's work for her video "Campo Geral"
 São Paulo Award for Literature Nominee for Newcomers under 40 (2014), for her book Esquilos de Pavlov

Exhibitions 
 International Center of Art and Landscape at Vassivière (2005)
 Art Center of Le Plateau in Paris (2005)

Works

Books 
 Insones (7 Letras, 2002)
 Körper und tage (German and Portuguese, Merz-Solitude, 2006)
 Celia Misteriosa (poetry, Illusion d'optique & Villa Medici, 2007), a collaboration between Erber and Federico Nicolao
 Os corpos e os dias ('The bodies and days', poetry, Portuguese, Editora de Cultura, 2008)
 Vazados & Molambos (2008)
 Bénédicte vê o mar ('Bénédicte sees the sea', Portuguese, Casa da Palavra, 2011)
 Esquilos de Pavlov ('Pavlov's Squirrels', Portuguese, Alfaguara, 2013)
 Bénédicte não se move ('Bénédicte does not move', 2014)
 A Retornada (poetry, Portuguese, 2017)

Video 
 The Glass House (1999–2008), a collaboration between Erber and Laercio Redondo
 Campo Geral
 Diário do Sertão (director, 2003)

References 

1979 births
Living people
21st-century Brazilian women artists
21st-century Brazilian artists
21st-century Brazilian women writers
21st-century Brazilian writers
Rio de Janeiro State University alumni
Pontifical Catholic University of Rio de Janeiro alumni
University of Copenhagen alumni